Homegrown Video is an amateur pornographic video production company based in San Diego.  Established in 1982. it was the first company to commercially release and distribute homemade, amateur pornography on videotape.

History 
Homegrown Video was born out of the back room of a tiny mom and pop video store in San Diego, CA. The advancement of video cameras and VHS tapes allowed Greg Swaim, the store's owner, to begin filming real couples at his popular sex parties. Swaim called the videos “Homegrown Videos” and rented them at his shop.  In 2007, AVN magazine listed “Homegrown Video #1”, the brand's flagship title, as one of the 50 most influential adult video titles ever released, as it was responsible for creation of the amateur pornography genre in adult video. Homegrown Video was the first company to distribute people's homemade sex tapes; Swaim solicited amateur tapes by advertising “Send in your home videos and earn up to $20 per minute” at the end of each Homegrown Video tape.

In 1993, Swaim sold Homegrown Video to Farrell Timlake (adult performer Tim Lake), who had submitted amateur videos of himself and his wife in the past. Swaim sold the company due to a mismanagement of funds and impending bankruptcy. Still inspired by the first Homegrown Video VHS they ever watched, the Timlakes decided to purchase the company in 1993, with money borrowed from Farrell's mother.

Timlake and his partners expanded the business to the Internet, cable television while taking the sales of their videotapes and DVDs worldwide. Author Eric Schlosser, in writing about Homegrown Video said the company served “as a clearinghouse for the democracy of porn, supplying hard-core videos by the people, for the people". The self-titled flagship title is now well past 800 volumes and is acknowledged as the longest running series in the history of porn.

Homegrown Video's establishment and domination of the amateur porn market is evident in its 11 AVN Awards and 2 XBIZ Awards for Best Amateur Release, Best Amateur Series, and Niche Studio of the Year.

Farrell Timlake, President
AVN Hall of Fame inductee Farrell Timlake (stage name: Tim Lake) and his partners have grown the brand's extensive library of amateur content in an ever-growing variety of niches.

In 1997, Timlake was brought on as Associate Producer and porn industry consultant for Trey Parker and Matt Stone’s feature movie, Orgazmo, which included a cameo performance. Much of the porn humor, and porn industry details, in the movie has been attributed to Timlake’s real life experiences in the adult industry. While researching for Orgazmo, Trey Parker was invited to an adult industry filming party at Buck Henry's house, which had been rented for the shoot. The resulting footage of the xxx-rated film Profiles #8, includes in the background mainstream actors Carrie Fisher, Richard Dreyfuss, and Timothy Hutton, in addition to Trey Parker and Matt Stone.

Timlake has, to date, performed in over 72 films, as well as directed and produced over 17 titles, culminating in 11 AVN Awards.

Spike Goldberg, CEO
Homegrown Video CEO and self-professed “porn nerd” Spike Goldberg was interested in creating an amateur porn series to sell online; Goldberg's brother introduced him to Farrell Timlake, who hired Goldberg as he demonstrated keen awareness of the fledgling online market. Goldberg was made a partner in Homegrown's parent entity, New Destiny Internet Group, where Goldberg lent his knowledge of technology and analytics to the company. By 1998 Goldberg revamped Homegrown's web department, and by 2000, Homegrown became the Internet's go-to source for quality amateur videos. Being part of the technology and business side of porn put Goldberg in the spotlight in 2004, when he led the industry trade group to fight technology patent lawsuits filed by Acacia Research.

In March 2013, with over a decade of hands-on experience, trusted business relationships, and a strong ethic guiding him, Goldberg was promoted to CEO of Homegrown Video.

Legal controversy
Starting in 2002, Acacia Media Research filed suit against more than 1000 adult production companies, including Homegrown Video, over patent infringement claims over the use of Digital Media Transmission technology.  During the course of the nearly-decade-long litigation, Acacia entered into licensing agreements with Hustler, Vivid, and Wicked. The creation of the "Adult Media Defense Group" in 2007, led by Homegrown Video CEO Spike Goldberg, spoke out publicly over the legality of the suit. As lead defendant in the case, Goldberg asserted that it was impossible to file suits based on a key patent that was indifferent to the mode of telecommunication. The suit was invalidated in 2009 by a federal judge; a federal appeals court affirmed the ruling in 2010.

Awards

References

External links 
 
 

1982 establishments in California
American pornographic film studios
Companies based in San Diego
Mass media companies established in 1982
Pornography in California